The 1987 Nations motorcycle Grand Prix was the fourth race of the 1987 Grand Prix motorcycle racing season. It took place on the weekend of 22–24 May 1987, at the Autodromo Nazionale Monza.

Classification

500 cc

References

Italian motorcycle Grand Prix
Nations
Nations